El Peñol may refer to:

El Peñol, Antioquia, a town and municipality in Antioquia Department, Colombia
El Peñol, Nariño, a town and municipality in Nariño Department, Colombia